Spiegelberg is a place in Rems-Murr-Kreis, Baden-Württemberg.

Spiegelberg may also refer to:
 Spiegelberg Stadium, Medford, Oregon, U.S.
 Spiegelberg Brothers, a 19th-century mercantile company in Santa Fe, U.S.
 Spiegelberg criteria, used to identify ovarian ectopic pregnancies
 Spiegelberg, a character in Die Räuber by Friedrich Schiller
 Spiegelberg (Namibia) Mountain in Namibia

People with the surname
 Frederic Spiegelberg (1897-1994), Stanford professor of religion
 Herbert Spiegelberg (1904-1990), American philosopher
 Otto Spiegelberg (1830-1881), German gynecologist
 Patrick Spiegelberg (1984-), Danish singer
 Wilhelm Spiegelberg (1870-1930), German Egyptologist